The Pakistan Institute of International Affairs (PIIA) is a non-profit, non-governmental organization based in Karachi whose mission is to analyse and promote the understanding of major international issues and current affairs.

History
PIIA was founded in 1947 in Karachi in affiliation with the Royal Institute of International Affairs (RIIA), London, and the Institute of Pacific Relations, New York City. The formal inauguration by the prime minister of Pakistan, Liaquat Ali Khan took place on 26 March 1948. The draft memorandum of the PIIA was considered and approved on 28 September 1948. Housed first in the Intelligence School on Queen's Road, the PIIA later moved to Frere Hall and thence, in 1955 (when the institute's building was completed), to its present location on Aiwan-e-Sadar Road.

Standing
According to a research report published by the Think Tanks and Civil Societies Programme (TTCSP) at the University of Pennsylvania that Pakistan Institute of International Affairs have clinched position among top 20 think tanks of the world, PIIA has secured the 18th position among 95 other think tanks in South Asia and the Pacific region in 2015 Global Go To Think Tank Index Report published on January 29.

The PIIA stands high in ranking of research institutes especially in the context of Pakistan. Besides other famous personalities and renowned scholars from around the world, PIIA members have also been addressed by several heads of states and government from around the world including Prof. Arnold J. Toynbee, Mr. Justice Potter Stewart of the US Supreme Court and Mr. Justice Philip C. Jessup of the International Court of Justice; statesmen such as Prime Minister S.W.R.D. Bandaranaike of Sri Lanka, Clement Attlee, Henry Kissinger and Ralph Bunche, Richard Nixon, Sutan Sjahrir of Indonesia; and national leaders such as Prime Minister Liaquat Ali Khan, President Ayub Khan, Prime Minister Zulfikar Ali Bhutto, President General Zia-ul-Haq, Prime Minister Benazir Bhutto, Chief Justice of Pakistan Justice Syed Sajjad Ali Shah, Foreign Minister Khurshid Mahmood Kasuri, Admiral Afzal Tahir and President General Pervez Musharraf. In April 2017, National Security Adviser to the prime minister Nawaz Sharif, Mr Janjua addressed an event arranged by the  Pakistan Institute of International Affairs.

Objectives
The institute is a nonofficial, nonpartisan, nonprofit body. Its objectives are to encourage and facilitate an understanding of international affairs, and of the conditions and attitudes of foreign countries and their peoples; and to promote the scientific study of international politics, economics and jurisprudence.

Areas of research
Foreign relations and diplomacy, security and defense, development studies, economic issues, political issues. Conflict Resolution, Human Rights, Armament, Disarmament and Dynamics of Security in the World.

Funding sources
Self generated. Rental income (80%), membership fees (3%), sales of publications(3%). Does not accept contract research. Budget (2000): USD 47,430.

Staff
Twenty one ( 19 male, 2 females ), including two in research, one professional librarian, and 18 among administrative staff members.

Executive Officers
 Masuma Hasan (Chairperson)
 Saqib, Amjad (Secretary)

Periodicals
Pakistan Horizon, founded in 1948 is the oldest research journal of international affairs on the Indian sub-continent. (English, quarterly, exchange/subscription)

Library: 30,557 books, 225 periodicals.

Research findings
All accessible. Some recent titles of Pakistan Horizon include:
Kashmir (April 2003); Pakistan-India Relations (July 2004); Afghanistan after 9/11 (January 2006), Pakistan's Foreign Policy Analysis (April 2007), Challenges to Global Security (July 2007, Women's Concerns in International Relations (October 2007)and Founding Members' Number (January–April 2008).

Former research officers
 Khalida Qureshi from 1962, later director of research and editor Pakistan Horizon, a position she held until her death in 1983
 Ambassador Karamatullah K. Ghori
 Zubeida Mustafa
 Prof. Dr. Naveed Ahmed Tahir
 Prof. Dr. Moonis Ahmar
 Prof. Dr. Sheikh Mutahir Ahmed
 Tehmina Mehmood
 Dr. Samina Ahmed
 Nausheen Wasi
 Syed Junaid Ahsan
 Nabiha Gul
 Sanam Noor
 Fizzah Ali
 Yasir Hanif
 Muhammad Adeel Qureshi

Head of Research
 Dr. Masuma Hasan

Former chairpersons
Fatehyab Ali Khan, (1936 – 26 September 2010)

See also
 Think tank
 Institute of Policy Studies (Pakistan)

References

Further reading
 K. Sarwar Hasan, The Pakistan Institute of International Affairs: How it was established, Pakistan Horizon, Vol. 61, No. 1/2, (January–April 2008), pp. 7–11,

External links
 Pakistan Institute of International Affairs

Political and economic think tanks based in Pakistan
Organisations based in Karachi
Foreign relations of Pakistan
Research institutes in Pakistan